Mary Dupuis Sammel is a biostatistician, who works as a professor in the Department of Biostatistics and Epidemiology in the Perelman School of Medicine at the University of Pennsylvania. As well as doing research on theoretical statistics and reproductive health,
she also raises guide dogs and has published research on their upbringing.

Education and career
Sammel graduated from the University of Michigan in 1986 with a bachelor's degree in statistics and completed a master's degree in applied statistics in 1988 at the same university. She did her doctoral studies at the Harvard School of Public Health, completing a Sc.D. in biostatistics in 1995.

Work with guide dogs
Sammel and her family have been active at fostering future guide dogs, from infancy through puppyhood until they are ready to go on to more intensive training with The Seeing Eye as a guide dog.

With a student, Emily Bray, Sammel studied the effects of dogs' mothers' behavior on the dogs. Their work showed that dogs with overly-attentive mothers tended to be less effective as guide dogs,
and less successful at completing guide dog training.

Recognition
In 2015, Sammel was elected as a Fellow of the American Statistical Association.

Selected publications

References

Year of birth missing (living people)
Living people
American statisticians
Women statisticians
Biostatisticians
University of Michigan College of Literature, Science, and the Arts alumni
Harvard School of Public Health alumni
Perelman School of Medicine at the University of Pennsylvania faculty
Fellows of the American Statistical Association